The following active airports serve the Edmonton Metropolitan Region in Alberta, Canada. Communities in parentheses indicates the airport is not in a community.

Land

Water aerodromes

Heliports

Former airports
The following airports once served the Edmonton Capital Region, but have since been closed:

See also

 List of airports in the Calgary area
 List of airports in the Fort McMurray area
 List of airports in the Lethbridge area
 List of airports in the Red Deer area
 Edmonton aircraft bombing
 Edmonton Airports

References

 
Airports Edmonton
Airports
Airports
Edmonton
Edmonton